Susan Flores Aceron (July 6, 1972 – October 9, 2016) was a Canadian actress and businesswoman who appeared in several film and television roles. She was best known for voicing Sailor Pluto in the Cloverway English adaptation of Sailor Moon. She also voiced a number of roles in Beyblades.

Death
On October 9, 2016, Aceron died of nasopharyngeal carcinoma at the age of 44.

Select filmography
 Honey, I Shrunk the Kids: The TV Show – Announcer
 Sailor Moon – Sailor Pluto (Sailor Moon S)
 The Ladies Man – Chinese Lover
 Medabots – Additional Voices
 Beyblade – Additional Voices
 The In-Laws – Nurse
 This Time Around – Hostess
 The Newsroom – Cashier

References

External links

1972 births
2016 deaths
Deaths from cancer in Alberta
Canadian film actresses
Canadian people of Filipino descent
Canadian television actresses
Canadian voice actresses
Actresses from Saskatchewan
Businesspeople from Saskatchewan
21st-century Canadian businesswomen
21st-century Canadian businesspeople
Deaths from nasopharynx cancer
People from Tisdale, Saskatchewan
20th-century Canadian actresses
21st-century Canadian actresses